Glendale Public Library is a name used for a group of eight library branches in Glendale, California, under the Library, Arts & Culture Department. Founded in 1907, the Glendale Library, Arts & Culture Department includes six neighborhood libraries as well as the Brand Library & Art Center, a regional visual arts and music library and performance venue housed in the historic 1904 mansion of Glendale pioneer Leslie C. Brand, and the Central Library, a 93,000 square foot center

Collections
According to internal calculations, as of June 30, 2005, GPL owned well over 700,000 volumes of print materials, with a majority (over 400,000) being housed at the Central Library. Not included in those totals are a wealth of currently uncataloged items of local historical importance (photographs and ephemera.) GPL also owns a large body of non-English print materials, (specializing in Armenian titles), as well as a "Genocide Memorial Collection" of works pertaining to many of mankind's worst moments.

History
Library services in Glendale were first provided in 1906. The women of the Tuesday Afternoon Club, a social and philanthropic organization, raised money through a series of lectures to fund a library collection. The library opened in a renovated pool room at Third and E (Wilson and Everett) Streets with seventy books, soon supplemented by a State Traveling Library of fifty more, and served a population of 1,186.

In 1907, the City Trustees passed Ordinance 53 which established and supported a library which "...shall be forever free to the inhabitants and nonresident taxpayers of the City of Glendale..." The first year the library had 251 books, 165 registered patrons, and a budget of $248.88. In 1913, a Carnegie grant of $12,500 made possible the construction of the main library at Louise and Fifth (Harvard Street). The building was completed and dedicated November 13, 1914. The building was enlarged in 1926. Between 1940 and 1942, two side wings were added, one becoming a children's library called the Hans Christian Andersen Room and the other housing Readers' Service.

The present Central Library building opened on March 13, 1973, on the former site of Glendale Union High School and Glendale College. With  it had over four times the floor space of the old structure. The next twenty years saw major changes in the City of Glendale and in library technology. The latest remodel has brought library users a larger Children's Room and a separate Audio Visual area. The new upper level includes an expansion of the Special Collections room to accommodate the valuable historical information housed there. The redesign of the Reference and Circulation areas has been specifically oriented toward better customer service. The creation of a Business Collection area and a Job Center recognizes Glendale's position as the third largest business center in California.

Brand Library & Art Center

Brand Library & Art Center is the art and music branch of the Glendale Library, Arts & Culture Department. Facilities at Brand Library & Art Center include an art and music library, art galleries and recital hall. Activities in the Center's art studios are programmed by the Community Services and Parks Department. The Library is staffed by subject specialist librarians and has over 110,000 items, including books, scores, DVDs, CDs, LPs, and magazines.

Brand Library is housed in a mansion built in 1904. Located in Brand Park high in the foothills overlooking Glendale and the San Fernando Valley, the mansion was built by Leslie C. Brand and named Miradero (The Overlook). The design is similar to the East Indian Pavilion built for the 1893 Columbian World Exposition held in Chicago and visited by Mr. Brand. The architecture is considered Saracenic, with crenellated arches, bulbous domes and minars combining characteristics of Spanish, Moorish, and Indian styles. In contrast to the cool white exterior, a Victorian decor was followed inside.  It was designed by architect Nathaniel Dryden, brother-in-law of Brand, and it was completed in 1904.

Mr. Brand died in the house in 1925. He bequeathed Miradero to the city, although Mrs. Brand retained rights of residence until her death. The will provided that the property’s should be used exclusively for a public park and library. Mrs. Brand died in 1945, and by 1956 the mansion had been converted into Brand Library.

Ten years later, in response to the need for larger quarters to serve the growing interest of the community, the city council allocated funds to construct an addition to Brand Library that would include facilities for art exhibitions, lectures and concerts, as well as an art studio for classes and workshops. The new addition was dedicated in October 1969.

The Associates of Brand Library & Art Center is a 501c3 charitable nonprofit organization founded in 1969 that has awarded art prizes in conjunction with an annual juried art exhibition, has received donations of art, and runs fundraisers to support the facility.

The Brand Library & Art Center was closed for two years for an extensive, $10 million renovation that was completed in 2014.

Computer Services
Glendale Public Library offers many services to its patrons, both at the Central location as well as its branches. GPL Central provides free wireless broadband internet access throughout the system. GPL currently provides wired internet access through their 32 public computers at Central and many at each branch location. GPL offers classes on various software such as Microsoft Word, Excel, and PowerPoint, in addition to their extremely popular "Computer Club for Beginners". The "Computer Club" class helps students of all ages learn the basics of operating a computer, searching the Internet, and using email. GPL also offers computer classes in Spanish and Armenian.

Adult Reading Program
The Glendale Public Library Adult Reading Program offers a unique approach to learning literacy skills. The program combines basic instruction with the adult students' goals, making it possible for adults who struggle with reading to learn and use the tools necessary for life, family, job and pride. Both those new to reading and those new to the English language can benefit from the Adult Reading Program.

References

External links

 Glendale Library, Arts & Culture website

Libraries in Los Angeles County, California
Carnegie libraries in California
1907 establishments in California
Buildings and structures in Glendale, California
Tourist attractions in Glendale, California
Library buildings completed in 1914